"Thanksgiving" is the tenth episode of the horror black comedy series Scream Queens. It premiered on November 24, 2015 on Fox. The episode was directed by Michael Lehmann and written by Brad Falchuk. The episode features special guest star Chad Michael Murray as Brad Radwell, the older brother of Chad Radwell (Glen Powell). The rest of the Radwell family are played by guest stars Alan Thicke, Julia Duffy, Patrick Schwarzenegger, and Rachele Brooke Smith. As this is the Thanksgiving special episode, the episode centers around the main characters' activities during Thanksgiving.

The episode was watched by 1.98 million viewers and received positive reviews from critics.

Plot

Chanel (Emma Roberts) tells Chad (Glen Powell) that Hester (Lea Michele) wasn't actually pregnant and that she pushed Hester down the stairs. Being a necrophiliac, he wants to see the body, but when Chanel leads him to the meat freezer to show it to him, the body isn't there. Chad suggests that Hester wasn't actually dead and that she got up and walked away after the Chanels put her there. Chad takes Chanel to spend Thanksgiving with his family. Each of his family members share one thing they're grateful for. As Chanel becomes more and more irritated by Mrs. Radwell's (Julia Duffy) arrogant remarks about her, Hester arrives unexpectedly. Chad, ashamed of his tumultuous relationship with her, tells his family that Hester is his "sober coach," claiming that he has a drinking problem. A fight quickly ensues. As a result, Mr. Radwell (Alan Thicke) offers Chanel a check for $50,000 if she leaves their house and never comes back. The Radwells begin to play pictionary as they continue to insult Chanel and Hester. Finally Chanel gets fed up and rants. She apologizes for trying to kill Hester and then proceeds to tell off each of the Radwells, ending with Chad, and telling him she never wants to talk to him again. She then storms away, accompanied by Hester, the two girls having made amends.

Gigi (Nasim Pedrad) spent Thanksgiving with Red Devil in their hotel room. Gigi complains about not being able to spend the holiday with her boyfriend, Wes (Oliver Hudson). But regardless, she thanks the devil for keeping her company. Moments later, room service brings them a meal. Gigi is about to cut it before she thanks the Devil for being the closest she has to family. She then decides the Red Devil should "do the honors," by cutting the bird and hands them the knife. The Red Devils turns on the knife and gives a devious look towards Gigi. Chanel #3 (Billie Lourd) goes to spend Thanksgiving with her adopted family, but is so disgusted by how arrogant and insane they are. She ends up leaving and going back to campus, not before saying she's starting a new family tradition; not to attend any family occasion ever. There, she finds Dean Cathy Munsch (Jamie Lee Curtis) preparing a turkey. As Cathy has Thanksgiving dinner with Grace (Skyler Samuels), Zayday (Keke Palmer), Pete (Diego Boneta), Chanel #5 (Abigail Breslin), Chanel #3, and Wes, they begin to argue over who they think the killer is. Cathy thinks it's Chanel #3, while Chanel #3 thinks it's Cathy. Wes starts to think it's Grace, but Grace provides evidence as to why she couldn't be, but why she suspects it's Chanel. She also says she thinks Chanel was the one who put hydrochloric acid in Melanie Dorkus's tanning spray.

Meanwhile, Pete tells a story based on the evidence he dug up, claiming Wes is the killer. Pete reveals that, by bribing a government official with drugs, he discovered that Wes was Boone's (Nick Jonas) father, and thus, the father of the other bathtub baby. Wes talks to Grace alone and tells her that he didn't know he had knocked up Sophia. After the two make up, Zayday calls them over for dinner. Chanel and Hester arrive, as does Chad soon after. He and Chanel make up as well, and Chanel #3 and Chanel #5 go retrieve the turkey. As Chanel uncovers the Turkey, everyone begins screaming in horror. It is revealed that instead of holding the turkey, the platter is holding Gigi's head.

Production
On September 11, 2015, Ryan Murphy announced that Patrick Schwarzenegger is joining the cast of Scream Queens. He portrayed Thad Radwell, the younger brother of Glen Powell's character Chad Radwell. On, Chad Michael Murray was cast as Brad Radwell, the older brother of Chad. Alan Thicke and Julia Duffy were cast as The Radwells' parents. They all made their guest appearance in this episode. Gary Grubbs and Faith Prince also guest starred in this episode as Chanel #3 (Billie Lourd)'s adoptive parents, Mr. and Mrs. Swenson. Rachele Brooke Smith appears as Muffy St. Pierre-Radwell, the wife of Chad Michael Murray's character Brad.

Reception

Ratings
"Thanksgiving" was watched live by 1.98 million U.S. viewers and received a 0.8/3 rating/share in the adult 18-49 demographic.

Reception
"Thanksgiving" received positive reviews from critics. LaToya Ferguson of The A.V. Club gave the episode an A−, citing "Again—and I can’t stress this enough—the episode is fun. Humor is apart [sic] of that, but it’s really an enjoyable episode to watch from top to bottom." IGN's Terri Schwartz gave the episode 8.5 out of 10 and said, "Scream Queens was losing me for a while, but the twist that Wes is the father of the bathtub girl's twins genuinely surprised me, and added a fun new, personal layer to the Red Devil Killer(s) mystery. Add that to a fun game of who-dunn-it and the introduction of the absolutely hatable Radwells and this was a great return to form for the FOX series."

References

2015 American television episodes
Scream Queens (2015 TV series) episodes
Television episodes written by Brad Falchuk
Thanksgiving television episodes